Government Law College, Chengalpattu is one of 14 government law colleges in the state of Tamil Nadu, India. Like the rest of the law colleges in Tamil Nadu, it is administered by Tamil Nadu's Directorate of Legal Studies, and affiliated to Tamil Nadu Dr. Ambedkar Law University.

The college has undergraduate and post graduate programs (LLM criminal law), and maintains a hostel for girl students.

References 

Law schools in Tamil Nadu
Universities and colleges in Kanchipuram district
Educational institutions established in 2002
2002 establishments in Tamil Nadu